HMS Bayano, built in 1913, was originally a banana boat for the Elders & Fyffes line. At the outbreak of World War I it was drafted into the Royal Navy on 21 November 1914 as an armed merchant auxiliary cruiser. Twenty-six survivors were pulled from the water.

Background

Once in the Royal Navy she was part of the 10th Cruiser Squadron. The Admiralty had begun to use experimental indicator nets to counter German submarines. Indicator nets were made from strong thin wires, draped from the surface of the sea and kept buoyant with kapok, small buoys or glass globes. Sections of the net were held together with clips which (in theory) would part when the section was hit by a submerged submarine. The net would wrap around the vessel and indicate its presence via a buoy being pulled along the surface of the sea. The Admiralty established 21 net barrages, one of which was in the North Channel.

Sinking

In the North Channel, HMS Bayano had reduced speed to avoid passing the net line in the dark en route to Liverpool for coaling. The auxiliary cruiser sank in five minutes. Most of the crew was asleep and only 26 men survived to be rescued by the British steamer Castlereagh. Bayano Lieutenant Commander Guy described Carr on the bridge, standing without fear waving goodbye while shouting "Good luck to you boys" before the ship disappeared under the waves.

Aftermath

Casualties

The captain and 194 other crew members were killed in the sinking.

Commemoration
Residents of the Isle of Man were greatly affected by the sinking as a number of bodies were washed up on the island. The funeral procession for the Bayano victims numbered in the thousands, even though the dead were not Manx. The Dominion of Newfoundland, part of the British Empire, was also hard hit. A dozen men from the Newfoundland Royal Naval Reserve were lost on Bayano.

Baralong incidents

 was attacked and sunk in the Western Approaches in position  by gunfire from Q-ship .  Her entire crew, including Bernhard Wegener, was killed in the so-called Baralong incidents.

Notes

Footnotes

References

 
 
 
 
 
 
 
 
 

 

Maritime incidents in 1915
1913 ships
World War I Auxiliary cruisers of the Royal Navy
Ships sunk by German submarines in World War I